Lobariella flynniana is a species of lichen in the family Peltigeraceae. Found in Hawaii, it was formally described as a new species in 2017 by lichenologists Robert Lücking  Bibiana Moncada and Clifford Smith. It is known to occur only at the type locality, a montane, mesic forest, where it grows on tree branches. The lichen thallus has numerous extensively branches lobules that give it a somewhat fruticose (bushy) appearance; this morphology is unique in the genus Lobariella. Secondary compounds that have been identified in Lobariella flynniana include pseudocyphellarin A, 4-O-methyl-gyrophoric acid, and gyrophoric acid. The specific epithet honours Timothy Flynn, the Herbarium Collections Manager at Kauai's National Tropical Botanical Garden, who assisted the authors with procuring the type.

References

Peltigerales
Lichen species
Lichens described in 2017
Lichens of Hawaii
Taxa named by Robert Lücking
Fungi without expected TNC conservation status